Winston Bernard Coard (born 10 August 1944) is a Grenadian politician who was Deputy Prime Minister in the People's Revolutionary Government of the New Jewel Movement. Coard launched a coup within the revolutionary government and took power for three days until he was himself deposed by General Hudson Austin.

Education
Bernard Coard, the son of Frederick McDermott Coard (1893–1978) and Flora Fleming (1907–2004), was born in Victoria, Grenada, and is a first cousin of Hon. Mr Justice Dunbar Cenac, 
Registry of the Eastern Caribbean Supreme Court; Hon. Mr Justice Dunbar Cenac's late father, Francis (Kimby) Cenac and the late Flora Coard were biological children of the late Isabella Cenac (née Fletcher). Coard is also the nephew of the late Hon. Mr Justice Dennis Cenac, the last of Isabella Cenac's eight children.

Coard was attending the Grenada Boys' Secondary School when he met Maurice Bishop, who was then attending Presentation Brothers' College. Coard and Bishop shared an interest in left-wing politics from an early age. They became friends and in 1962 they joined together to found the Grenada Assembly of Youth After Truth. Twice per month, the two would lead political debates in St. George's Central Market Place.

Coard moved to the United States, where he studied sociology and economics at Brandeis University and joined the Communist Party USA. In 1967, he moved to England and studied political economy at the University of Sussex. That year, he married his wife Phyllis while they were students in England, and Coard joined the Communist Party of Great Britain there.

Teaching career
He worked for two years as a schoolteacher in London and ran several youth organisations in South London. In 1971 he published a 50-page book How the West Indian Child Is Made Educationally Sub-normal in the British School System: The Scandal of the Black Child in Schools in Britain. The book explained that British schools had a pervasive bias toward treating white children as normal, which led to black children being labelled as "educationally subnormal" (learning-disabled). Coard wrote:

The [black] children are therefore made neurotic about their race and culture. Some become behaviour problems as a result. They become resentful and bitter at being told their language is second-rate, and their history and culture is non-existent; that they hardly exist at all, except by the grace of whites.

Coard's thesis was widely cited, even long after his revolutionary career, as a summary of the role of institutional racism in the relationship between race and intelligence. In 2005, it was republished as the central article in the collection Tell it Like it is: How Our Schools Fail Black Children. A 2021 BBC One documentary Subnormal: A British Scandal describes the events surrounding the racism of a leaked school report, leading to the publication of Coard's book. Produced/directed by Lyttanya Shannon, and executive produced by Steve McQueen, the film features interviews with people who were put into ESN schools, and activists, academics and psychologists and others who worked to expose the scandal at the time, such as Gus John, Waveney Bushell, as well as with Coard. He concluded that, 50 years after the ESN scandal was exposed, "the substance ... of the educational suppression of Caribbean-origin children remains".

After completing his doctorate at Sussex, Coard moved to Trinidad, where he was a visiting lecturer at the Institute of International Relations at the University of the West Indies at St. Augustine, Trinidad and Tobago, from 1972 to 1974. He also lectured from 1974 to 1976 at the Mona, Jamaica, campus of the University of the West Indies. During his stay in Jamaica, he joined the communist Worker's Liberation League and helped draft the League's manifesto.

Revolution
In 1976, Coard returned to Grenada, soon becoming active in Grenadian politics. Soon after returning home he joined the New Jewel Movement (NJM), his childhood friend's left-wing organisation, and ran for and won a parliamentary seat in St. George's in the 1976 elections.

The NJM, led by Maurice Bishop, successfully led a bloodless coup against Eric Gairy's government on 13 March 1979. The radio station, military barracks and police stations were targeted. Before long, they had control of the entire island. The NJM then announced the temporary suspension of the constitution and parliamentary rule.

Influenced by Marxists such as Daniel Ortega and Fidel Castro, Bishop's NJM established a revolutionary government in Grenada. Aid from Cuba allowed the NJM to build Point Salines International Airport, an international airport with a  runway in St. George's. In 1980, Coard was the head of a delegation to Moscow to formalise relations with the Soviet Union.

The removal of Bishop
Bernard Coard was serving as the revolutionary government's Minister of Finance, Trade and Industry, as well as the Deputy Prime Minister under Bishop.

It is alleged that Coard ordered Bishop to be put under house arrest on 19 October 1983 and took control of the government. As word of Bishop's arrest spread, large demonstrations broke out in many places. A demonstration in the capital led to Bishop being freed from house arrest by the demonstrators, making their way to the army headquarters at Fort Rupert (known today as Fort George). However, Bishop and seven others, including cabinet ministers of the government, were killed shortly after under unresolved circumstances. Coard was in turn ousted by General Hudson Austin, who nominally ruled the country for six days.

Just after Marines landed in Grenada, Coard, along with his wife Phyllis, Selwyn Strachan, John Ventour, Liam James and Keith Roberts, were arrested.

Trial and prison
They were tried in August 1986 on charges of ordering the murder of Maurice Bishop and seven others. Coard was sentenced to death, but this was commuted to life imprisonment in 1991. He served his sentence in Richmond Hill Prison, where he was engaged in teaching and instructing fellow inmates in many subjects, including economics and sociology.

In September 2004, the prison in which he was held was damaged by Hurricane Ivan and many inmates took the opportunity to flee, but Coard said he chose not to escape, saying he would not leave until his name was cleared.

Release
On 7 February 2007, the London-based Privy Council ordered a re-sentencing of Coard and the others convicted for the 1983 killing of Bishop and some of his cabinet colleagues. The re-sentencing hearing began on 18 June 2007. On 27 June, the judge gave Coard and his fellow defendants a 30-year sentence, which included the time already spent in prison. On 5 September 2009, Coard was released from prison. Upon release he said he did not want to be involved in politics again.

Bernard Coard has three children.

See also
Invasion of Grenada
Reagan Doctrine
Grenada 17
Franklyn Harvey
Education (film), a dramatization of the events surrounding Coard's critique of the British school system

References

External links
The Grenada Revolution Online
The Lost Bishop Photos
Interview with Bernard Coard 2005

1944 births
Living people
Alumni of the University of Sussex
Communist Party of Great Britain members
Finance ministers of Grenada
Deputy Prime Ministers of Grenada
Grenadian communists
Brandeis University alumni
University of the West Indies academics
Grenadian prisoners sentenced to death
Prisoners sentenced to death by Grenada
Grenadian people convicted of murder
People convicted of murder by Grenada
New Jewel Movement politicians
Anti-revisionists
Grenadian schoolteachers
Schoolteachers from London
Grenadian expatriates in the United Kingdom
Leaders who took power by coup
Leaders ousted by a coup
People from Saint Mark Parish, Grenada
Grenadian male writers
Heads of government who were later imprisoned
20th-century Grenadian politicians